Telefon Bay is a small bay on the north-west coast of Port Foster, Deception Island, in the South Shetland Islands of Antarctica. It is surmounted by Telefon Ridge. The name appears on the chart of the French Antarctic Expedition under Charcot, 1908–10.

The name derives from the ship SS Telefon, which was repaired here.

Antarctic Specially Protected Area
The bay forms part of an Antarctic Specially Protected Area (ASPA 140), comprising several separate sites on Deception Island, and designated as such primarily for its botanic and ecological values.

References

 SCAR Composite Antarctic Gazetteer

External links
Secretariat of the Antarctic Treaty Visitor Guidelines and island description

Bays of the South Shetland Islands
Geography of Deception Island
Antarctic Specially Protected Areas